Kimberly Clausing is an American economist. She is the Eric M. Zolt Chair in Tax Law and Policy at UCLA School of Law, and a nonresident senior fellow at the Peterson Institute for International Economics. From 2021 to 2022, she was the deputy assistant secretary for tax analysis at the United States Department of the Treasury. Clausing is known for her work on international trade and tax policy, particularly the taxation of multinational corporations.

Education
Clausing graduated magna cum laude with a B.A. from Carleton College in 1991. She then attended Harvard University and received an M.A. in economics in 1993. She received her Ph.D. in economics from Harvard in 1996 with a thesis titled Essays in International Economic Integration. From 1994 to 1995, she worked as a staff economist at the Council of Economic Advisers. After earning her Ph.D., at the age of 25, she started teaching economics at Reed College, eventually becoming Thormund Miller and Waltern Mintz Professor of Economics. From 2006 to 2007, she was an associate professor at Wellesley College.

Career and contributions

An expert on the taxation of multinational firms, Clausing studies international tax incentives, base erosion and profit shifting, tax inversion, and their connections to international trade.

She has received two Fulbright Research awards, one to the Centre for European Policy Studies in Brussels in 1999 and one to the Eastern Mediterranean University and the University of Cyprus in 2012.

Clausing has worked on economic policy research with the International Monetary Fund, the Hamilton Project, the Brookings Institution and the Tax Policy Center, and she has testified before the House Ways and Means Committee and the Senate Committee on Finance.

She criticized the 2017 Tax Cuts and Jobs Act of 2017, arguing that "the bill replies to decades of worsening income inequality with arguably the most regressive tax policy change of our lifetimes" and that "the bill answers our huge problem of multinational company profit shifting by increasing the incentive to offshore."

Clausing has provided informal policy advice to Oregon Senator Ron Wyden, a long-time supporter of tax reform. Since 2017, she has been an opinion contributor for The Hill.

In March 2019, Clausing published her first book, Open: The Progressive Case for Free Trade, Immigration, and Global Capital.

Clausing joined the faculty of the UCLA School of Law in 2021. Later that year, she was nominated and confirmed to the position of Deputy Assistant Secretary for Tax Analysis at the U.S. Department of the Treasury. She left her position at the Treasury Department in 2022.

Selected works

References

External links
 Kimberly Clausing's home page
 Curriculum Vitae of Kimberly Clausing
 Publications by Kimberly Clausing
 FT Podcast Alphachat: Kimberly Clausing makes the case for open economies
 Vox Weeds Podcast, A Progressive Case for Globalism
 Brookings Event: Kimberly Clausing: The progressive case for free trade and globalization

21st-century American economists
American women economists
Economists from Illinois
Harvard Graduate School of Arts and Sciences alumni
Carleton College alumni
People from Champaign, Illinois
Reed College faculty
Educators from Portland, Oregon
American women educators
Living people
1970 births
21st-century American women